The discography of Colombian recording artist Karol G consists of four studio albums, one mixtape, 67 singles (including 8 as featured artist) and five promotional singles.

Albums

Studio albums

Mixtapes
 Super Single (2013)

Singles

As a lead artist

As a featured artist

Promotional singles

Other charted songs

Notes

References

Karol G
Discographies of Colombian artists